Quinze de Novembro River may refer to:

Brazil
 Quinze de Novembro River (Espírito Santo)
 Quinze de Novembro River (Santa Catarina)

See also
 Quinze de Novembro, Rio Grande do Sul, Brazil